Pradhan Mantri Kisan Urja Suraksha evam Utthaan Mahabhiyan (KUSUM) Yojana was launched by the Government of India to increase the income of farmers and provide sources for irrigation and de-dieselising the agricultural sector. The PM-Kusum scheme got administrative approval in March 2019 and guidelines were prepared in July 2019. The scheme was launched by the Ministry of New and Renewable Energy (MNRE) for setting up solar pumps and other new power plants across the country.

The PM-KUSUM scheme of the Government of India is one of the largest initiatives in the world to provide clean energy to more than 3.5 million farmers by solarising their agriculture pumps and allowing farmers to up 10 GW distributed solar projects. The scheme plans to set up 30.8 GW of solar capacity by December 31, 2022, through the financial assistance of INR 340.35 billion (US$4.65 billion).

The scheme is divided into three components. which are discussed further.

 Component A- PM-KUSUM scheme aims to install grid-connected ground-mounted solar power plants (up to 2 MW) aggregating to a total capacity of 10 GW
 Component B- install 2 million standalone solar pumps
 Component C- solarize 1.5 million grid connected agricultural pumps

All components of the KUSUM Scheme combined would support the installation of the additional solar capacity of 30.80 GW.

Under Kusum Yojana, a group of farmers, panchayats, cooperatives can apply to install solar pumps. The total cost included in this scheme is divided into three categories in which the government will help the farmers. The government will provide 60% subsidy to the farmers and 30% of the cost will be given by the government in the form of a loan. Farmers will only have to pay 10% of the total cost of the project. Farmers can sell electricity generated from solar panels. The money received after selling electricity can be used to start a new business.

References 

Modi administration initiatives
 Government schemes in India